Ardtun is a settlement on the Isle of Mull, in Argyll and Bute, Scotland. Ardtun is within the parish of Kilfinichen and Kilvickeon.

References

External links

Knockan - The House that Black built (archive.org) - A detailed linear case study of one Ardtun family from before the Highland Clearances to the present day.

Villages on the Isle of Mull